The Oatman Drug Company Building, located at 1 Main St. in Oatman, Arizona, was built in 1915.  It has been listed on the National Register of Historic Places since 2006.  The building has served as a restaurant, as a drug/general store, as a medical business/office, as a professional building, and as a financial institution.

It is a  two-story false front building, at the eastern edge of Oatman near the locally noted "Elephant's Tooth" rock outcropping.

The building is significant for association with commercial activity—including historic Route 66 business in Oatman.  It is one of few surviving buildings from Oatman's boom years, c. 1913–1934, since many buildings were destroyed in a 1921 fire.

References 

Commercial buildings on the National Register of Historic Places in Arizona
Commercial buildings completed in 1915
Buildings and structures in Mohave County, Arizona
National Register of Historic Places in Mohave County, Arizona
Western false front architecture